Giuseppe Garibaldi was the 7th ship of the Giuseppe Garibaldi class of armored cruisers built for the Royal Italian Navy (Regia Marina) in the 1890s. She was built to replace lead ship of her class, which was sold to Argentina and renamed the ARA Garibaldi. The ship often served as a flagship and made several deployments to the Eastern Mediterranean and the Levant during her career. At the beginning of the Italo-Turkish War of 1911–12 she bombarded Tripoli. Giuseppe Garibaldi bombarded Beirut in early 1912 and sank an Ottoman ironclad there. Several months later she bombarded the defenses of the Dardanelles.

The ship spent several months deployed to Albania after the end of the First Balkan War in 1913 to protect Italian interests there. Giuseppe Garibaldi was sunk by an Austro-Hungarian submarine in the Adriatic Sea shortly after Italy declared war on the Central Powers in 1915 with the loss of 53 crewmen. Her wreck was discovered in 2008 and has been examined by underwater archaeologists in subsequent years.

Design and description
She displaced  at normal load. The ship was powered by two vertical triple-expansion steam engines, each driving one shaft, using steam from 24 coal-fired Niclausse boilers. Her complement ordinarily consisted of 555 officers and enlisted men and 578 when acting as a flagship.

Her main armament consisted of one  gun in a turret forward of the superstructure and two  guns in a twin turret aft. Ten of the  guns that comprised her secondary armament were arranged in casemates amidships; the remaining four 152-millimeter guns were mounted on the upper deck. Giuseppe Garibaldi also had ten  and six  guns to defend herself against torpedo boats. She was fitted with four single  torpedo tubes.

The ship's waterline armour belt had a maximum thickness of  amidships and tapered to  towards the ends of the ship. The conning tower, casemates, and gun turrets were also protected by 150-millimeter armor.

Construction and service
Giuseppe Garibaldi, named after General Giuseppe Garibaldi, one of the founders of modern Italy, was laid down at the Gio. Ansaldo & C. shipyard in Genoa-Sestri Ponente on 21 September 1898 and launched on 29 June 1899. While conducting preliminary steam trials on 12 July 1900, tubes in two of her boilers burst, killing one crewman and wounding two others. Repairs took until 10 August and she was completed on 1 January 1901. From 23 July to 2 October 1902, the ship cruised the Mediterranean, making port calls at Tripoli and in the Aegean Sea. The following year, Giuseppe Garibaldi made port visits to Algiers, Salonica, and Piraeus, Greece. During the 1905 fleet maneuvers, she was assigned to the "hostile" force blockading La Maddalena, Sardinia. The ship was part of the international expeditionary force that occupied Lemnos and Mytilene in November–December 1905 in a failed effort to force the Ottoman Empire to pay its debts to European countries in a timely manner. Giuseppe Garibaldi was deployed to the Levant in May–July 1907 and again in June 1908.

When the Italo-Turkish War began on 29 September 1911, she was flagship of the 4th Division of the 2nd Squadron of the Mediterranean Fleet, commanded by Rear Admiral Paolo Thaon di Revel, and was one of the ships that bombarded Tripoli on 3–4 October. Giuseppe Garibaldi was the first ship to enter the harbor after the conclusion of the bombardment when a small landing party entered Fort Hamidiye and disabled the breech mechanisms of the fort's guns. The desultory bombardment killed 12 Ottoman soldiers and severely wounded 23 more in addition to 7 dead civilians. On 13 October, the three sisters sailed to Augusta, Sicily to recoal. The ship andVarese were in Tobruk in January 1912 while the bulk of the fleet was refitting in Italy.

Giuseppe Garibaldi and Francesco Ferruccio bombarded Beirut on 24 February 1912, setting the elderly  on fire. Giuseppe Garibaldi later entered the harbor and torpedoed the ironclad, sinking it and killing two officers and 40 enlisted men. Her entry forced the torpedo boat  to scuttle itself. Varese is sometimes credited with participating also in the bombardment. The bombardment killed over 140 civilians and wounded more than 200. On 18 April, Giuseppe Garibaldi and Varese bombarded the fortifications at the Dardanelles, heavily damaging them. After returning to Italy later that month, the ship began a refit that lasted through mid-June that included replacing her worn-out guns.

After the end of the First Balkan War in May 1913, Giuseppe Garibaldi was deployed to the Albanian port of Scutari to ensure that it was returned by Montenegro to the Ottoman Empire and to protect Italian interests in the city. She returned home in August before deploying to Benghazi in February–March 1914.

When Italy declared war on the Central Powers in May 1915, she was the flagship of the 5th Cruiser Division, commanded by Rear Admiral Eugenio Trifari, and based at Brindisi. On 5 June the division bombarded rail lines near Ragusa, modern Dubrovnik, and departed Brindisi on the evening of 17 July to do the same near Ragusa Vecchia the following morning. Shortly after beginning the bombardment at 04:00, Giuseppe Garibaldi was struck by one torpedo, on the starboard side near the aft boiler rooms, fired by the Austro-Hungarian submarine . She sank within minutes on an even keel, although only 53 crewmen were killed. The remaining 525 were rescued by three destroyers left behind to rescue survivors as the division immediately retreated to avoid further attacks.

The wreck was initially located by a Czech expedition in 2008 although the death of one diver on 9 September forestalled any investigation of the wreck. The group also lacked any permits to dive on Giuseppe Garibaldi as it is a protected war grave which caused them to be expelled from the country. A follow-up Croatian expedition explored and filmed the wreck in August 2009 using CCR (Closed Circuit Rebreather) technology. Official expeditions were made in November 2009 and May 2010 to the wreck by an international team of underwater archaeologists.

Notes

Footnotes

Bibliography

External links

 Kalajdzic, Ahmet (28 August 2009), http://www.slobodnadalmacija.hr/Mozaik/tabid/80/articleType/ArticleView/articleId/67832/Default.aspx
 
  Giuseppe Garibaldi (1899) Marina Militare website

Giuseppe Garibaldi-class cruisers of the Regia Marina
Ships built in Genoa
1899 ships
World War I cruisers of Italy
Ships sunk by Austro-Hungarian submarines
World War I shipwrecks in the Adriatic Sea
Maritime incidents in 1915
Ships built by Gio. Ansaldo & C.
2008 archaeological discoveries